1356 Nyanza, provisional designation , is a dark asteroid from the background population of the outer asteroid belt, approximately 63 kilometers in diameter. It was discovered on 3 May 1935, by South-African astronomer Cyril Jackson at the Union Observatory in Johannesburg. The asteroid was named for the former Nyanza Province in Kenya, Africa.

Orbit and classification 

Nyanza is a non-family asteroid of the main belt's background population. It orbits the Sun in the outer asteroid belt at a distance of 2.9–3.2 AU once every 5 years and 5 months (1,977 days; semi-major axis of 3.08 AU). Its orbit has an eccentricity of 0.05 and an inclination of 8° with respect to the ecliptic.

The body's observation arc begins at Lowell Observatory in October 1931, three and a half years prior to its official discovery observation at Johannesburg.

Naming 

This minor planet was named for the former Nyanza Province located in southwestern Kenya, bordering on Lake Victoria. Its provincial capital was Kisumu. In 2010, Kenya's 8 provinces were reorganized into 47 counties. The official naming citation was mentioned in The Names of the Minor Planets by Paul Herget in 1955.

Physical characteristics 

Nyanza has been characterized as a primitive P-type asteroid by the Wide-field Infrared Survey Explorer (WISE). It is also an assumed carbonaceous C-type.

Rotation period 

In May 2005, a rotational lightcurve of Nyanza was obtained from photometric observations by French amateur astronomer Pierre Antonini. Lightcurve analysis gave a well-defined rotation period of 12.422 hours with a brightness amplitude of 0.28 magnitude.

Diameter and albedo 

According to the surveys carried out by the Infrared Astronomical Satellite IRAS, the Japanese Akari satellite and the NEOWISE mission of NASA's WISE telescope, Nyanza measures between 60.078 and 64.73 kilometers in diameter and its surface has an albedo between 0.04 and 0.0537.

The Collaborative Asteroid Lightcurve Link derives an albedo of 0.0352 and a diameter of 64.59 kilometers based on an absolute magnitude of 10.2.

References

External links 
 Asteroid Lightcurve Database (LCDB), query form (info )
 Dictionary of Minor Planet Names, Google books
 Asteroids and comets rotation curves, CdR – Observatoire de Genève, Raoul Behrend
 Discovery Circumstances: Numbered Minor Planets (1)-(5000) – Minor Planet Center
 
 

001356
Discoveries by Cyril Jackson (astronomer)
Named minor planets
19350503